Kawai is a village and union council (an administrative subdivision) of Mansehra District in the Khyber-Pakhtunkhwa province of Pakistan. It is located in the northeast of the district on the side of Ghanool and lies in an area that was affected by the 2005 Kashmir earthquake.

References 

Union councils of Mansehra District
Kawai Village

http://www.visitpk.com

http://www.visitpk.com